Grégoire André Defrel (born 17 June 1991) is a French professional footballer who plays as a forward for Serie A club Sassuolo.

Club career

Parma
Defrel joined Parma in 2009, and made his debut for the club as a substitute at the age of 19 on 22 May 2011, in the final game of the 2010–11 Serie A season in a dead rubber against Cagliari, a match that ended 1–1.

Cesena
In June 2012, Cesena and Parma made a series of cashless player swaps, in which Defrel (€1.2 million) and Gianluca Lapadula (€1.4 million) went to Cesena, whilst Andrea Rossini (€1.6 million) and Nicola Del Pivo (€1.0 million) went to Parma. Both clubs retained 50% registration rights. In June 2013 and June 2014, Defrel's co-ownership was renewed. Despite Parma going bankrupted and failing to find a new buyer on 25 June 2015, Cesena submitted a bid of reported €51,000 to Lega Serie A to solve the co-ownership in favour of Cesena, despite the club not being required to do so.

Sassuolo
On 5 August 2015, Sassuolo announced that they had signed Defrel from Cesena for an undisclosed fee. He was given the number 92 shirt.

Roma
On 20 July 2017, Defrel re-joined former manager Eusebio Di Francesco at Roma on loan, for €5 million loan fee, with an obligation to make the transfer permanent for an additional €15 million (plus €3 million bonuses) should certain sporting targets be met. At the same time, Sassuolo signed Roma youth products Davide Frattesi and Riccardo Marchizza as part of the deal, for a total fee of €8 million.

Sampdoria (loan)
On 27 July 2018, Defrel joined Sampdoria on a season-long loan with the option to buy from Roma.

Sassuolo return (loan)
On 30 August 2019, Defrel returned to Sassuolo on a season-long loan deal.

International career
In May 2019, Defrel was named to Martinique's provisional squad for the 2019 CONCACAF Gold Cup. However, he was dropped from the final roster.

Style of play
A fine dribbler, Defrel has been compared to compatriot Jérémy Ménez.

Career statistics

Club

References

1991 births
Living people
People from Meudon
French footballers
French people of Martiniquais descent
French expatriate footballers
Parma Calcio 1913 players
Calcio Foggia 1920 players
A.C. Cesena players
U.S. Sassuolo Calcio players
A.S. Roma players
U.C. Sampdoria players
Serie A players
Serie B players
Serie C players
Expatriate footballers in Italy
Association football forwards
Footballers from Hauts-de-Seine